The World Islands (Arabic: جزر العالم; Juzur al-Ālam) are an archipelago of small artificial islands constructed in the shape of a world map, located in the waters of the Persian Gulf, off the coast of Dubai, United Arab Emirates. The World Islands are composed mainly of sand dredged from Dubai's shallow coastal waters, and are one of several artificial island developments in Dubai. The World's developer is Nakheel Properties, and the project was originally conceived by Sheikh Mohammed bin Rashid Al Maktoum, the ruler of Dubai. The construction was done by two Dutch (joint venture) specialist companies, Van Oord and Boskalis. The same companies also created the Palm Jumeirah.

Construction of the 300 islands began in 2003, before being halted due to the financial crisis of 2007–2008. Though 60% of the islands were sold to private contractors in 2008, development on most of the islands has not started. As of July 2012, Lebanon Island was developed and was the only island that had so far been developed commercially, being used for private corporate events and public parties. As of late 2013, only two of the islands had been developed. In January 2014, Kleindienst Group announced the launch of "The Heart of Europe" project; by February 2014, JK Properties, one of Kleindienst Group's brands, announced that the project was "well underway". The first of these series of islands will be Europe, Sweden and Germany with development led by Kleindienst Group.

The Wild Project
Roughly  of shoreline was created. The World's overall development costs were estimated at $13 billion CAD in 2005.

The archipelago consists of seven sets of islands, representing the continents of Europe, Africa, Asia, North America, South America, Antarctica, and Oceania. Each artificial island is named for its representative country, landmark, or region such as the France, California, Mount Everest, Australia, New Mexico, Upernavik, Buenos Aires, New York, Mexico, St. Petersburg and India.

History
The project was unveiled in May 2003 by Sheikh Mohammed and dredging began four months later in September 2003. By January 2008, 60% of the islands were sold, 20 of which were bought in the first four months of 2007. On 10 January 2008 the final stone on the breakwater was laid, completing development of the archipelago. As of July 2012, a second island, the Lebanon Island (1.5 hectares or 15,045.01 m2 and 482.21 metres of perimeter) was developed and was 'the only island that has so far been developed commercially, is used for private corporate events and public parties.'

Project difficulties
The Times Online reported in September 2009 that work on The World had been suspended due to the effects of the global financial crisis.
Nakheel denied 2010 reports that the islands were sinking into the sea as wholly inaccurate. Despite the denial, The Daily Telegraph reported in January 2011 that an independent company, Penguin Marine, provided verification on the erosion of the islands and the silting of the passageways between the islands. Due to finance and technical problems, Penguin Marine, the company contracted to provide transportation to the archipelago, is attempting to get out of the annual fees of $1.6 million paid to Nakheel properties.

Until early 2012, only one of the islands had been occupied by a building (a show home) on it, and commercial or residential properties were not currently being constructed on any of the other islands. Property prices in the Emirates had fallen 58% from their peak in the fourth quarter of 2008. The world economic recovery from the Great Recession has resulted in a rebound for the Dubai real estate market: it has been reported that "residential prices [in Dubai] rose by 17.9% from August 2012 to 2013, while rents soared by 14.9% in the same period."

Purchase and development plans

The World was supposed to be serviced by four major transportation hubs linked by waterways. Land parcels are supposedly zoned for various uses: estate, mid density, high density, resorts and commercial. A Dubai Infinity Holdings construction planner has stated that developers have been negotiating with Nakheel about temporary siting of a cement batching plant on one of the islands to supply subdivided construction.

The plan was for utilities to be routed under water, with water plants at each of the hubs pumping fresh water to the islands. Power was to be supplied by the Dubai Grid and distributed through underwater cables, however as of February 2015 no cables had been laid, so that developers currently have to provide their own power from diesel generators. Wastewater and refuse systems are an individual concern for each island.

Nakheel Group is itself further developing a resort named Coral Island over 20 islands that make up the North American part of The World. The low-rise development will include a marina and hotel village.
The second largest confirmed development is the purchase of 14 islands that make up Australia and New Zealand by Investment Dar of Kuwait. The islands are being terraformed to be developed as a resort named OQYANA.

Irish business consortium Larionovo had plans to develop the Ireland island into an Irish-themed resort. The plans include a large internal marina, apartments and villas, a gym, hotel, and an Irish-themed pub. In July 2007 it was announced that the Ireland Island would feature a recreation of Northern Ireland's Giant's Causeway. However, on the 25th of November 2008, a provisional liquidator was appointed to Larionovo. As of October 2022, this has not happened. The islands of Great Britain and Moscow on The World were acquired by Premier Real Estate Bureau in the Summer of 2008.

In April 2008, Salya Corporation announced that it had acquired the islands of Finland and Brunei in The World and planned to develop them into fashion-themed resorts. Salya spent about Dh800 million (US$218 million) to purchase the islands and plans to spend a further Dh2.4 billion (US$654 million) on development. Brunei Island will be turned into a Fashion TV resort and Finland Island will be turned into a fashion community called FTV palace. 

Safi Qurashi, the seven-time multi-millionaire entrepreneur  at the head of Premier, and his business partner Mustafa Nagri, paid an estimated US$64 million for the  piece of land; he was later convicted for non-payment of cheques and sentenced to seven years in jail. 
However, on appeal he was later found not guilty and released from prison in July 2012 when he was declared innocent of two of the three charges. On the final charges the civil court final judgment showed he owed no money, was a victim of fraud and vindicated him completely by awarding US$10.8 Million to be paid back to him by his former partner who had defrauded him. Safi Qurashi is still the owner of Great Britain Island and continues to live and run his businesses in Dubai and is still confident of developing the Island of Great Britain into a unique destination. This also has not happened as of October 2022.

Josef Kleindienst and his firm JK Properties are developing The Heart of Europe, a collection of seven islands (Germany, Netherlands, Sweden, Ukraine, Main Europe, Switzerland and Monaco) in the European section of the World, into an island luxury resort. The resort is meant to create a fully immersive European experience, with outdoor snow, and stores accepting only the Euro as a currency. It is set to open in 2020.

In June 2020, a street called Raining Street was being built as part of the Heart of Europe project, with plans to create artificial rainfall once the outdoor temperature exceeds 27 degrees Celsius.

Timeline of construction

May 2003: The World development was announced by Nakheel, total completion scheduled for 2008.
August 2004: It was announced that land reclamation would cost at AED 7.3 billion ($2 billion).
April 2005: Sand dredging 55 percent complete, 88 islands had been completed.
30 March 2006: Richard Branson appeared at a media conference on the Great Britain island. However, this was to announce direct London-to-Dubai flights by Virgin Atlantic, and was not related to his investing in the project.
October 2006: Seven-time Formula One World Champion Michael Schumacher was presented with one of the islands by Mohammed bin Rashid Al Maktoum on the occasion of his final Grand Prix, in Brazil. Schumacher's manager Willi Weber, suggested, "Perhaps he'll build a kart racing track on [the island].
December 2006: The World reclamation 90 percent complete.
October 2007: Nakheel announced the sale of Ireland, and Shanghai in October 2007.
15 November 2007: Brad Pitt and Angelina Jolie were reported to have purchased the island Ethiopia. The claim has since been refuted.
January 2008: The World breakwater is completed.
19 February 2008: Cinnovation Group acquired a  island as part of a project valued at $200 million USD. Guest and residential villas and a hospitality complex are planned.

25 February 2008: Dubai Multi Commodities Centre announced that it will establish a  pearling and marine entertainment center in association with Paspaley Pearling Corporation. It will be located on an island in the Antarctic region of The World.
September 2008: Dubai's Limitless announced plans to develop a $161 million USD wellness resort on an island in "Siberia". Pearl Dubai paid US$27.2 million for a  island nearby.
28 December 2008: Turkey Island was bought by MNG Holding in June 2008 for US$19 million.
28 December 2008: China's Zhongzhou International announced that it will be developing a hotel resort on Shanghai island.
28 December 2008: Nakheel said 70 percent of The World had been sold.
October 2009: An Emirates Business report on 13 October 2009 that 2 islands were sold in July and August 2009.
December 2009: Dubai based Kleindienst Group said they would start construction of the Heart of Europe in early 2010, according to a press report of 17 December 2009. Islands include Austria, Germany, Netherlands, Ukraine, Sweden and Switzerland.
January 2010: On 28 January 2010 Emirates Business reported that Major Trade had started development of their projects on an island in the Greenland area, a villa and hotel resort.
23 February 2010: Dubai-based Kleindienst Group started work on the Germany island of The World, according to a press release on 24 February 2010.
17 July 2012: The Royal Island Beach Club opened on Lebanon Island.
6 May 2013: Nakheel announces that an out of court settlement has been reached between itself and developer Kleindienst Group, allowing construction on "The Heart of Europe" to resume.
10 June 2013: Construction began on the island Taiwan.
2 July 2013: Nakheel announces that settlements "with São Paulo Development Ltd for São Paulo Island and a GCC investor for the purchase of Nord Island", totaling "AED 185 million", along with the earlier out of court settlement with Kleindienst Group (valued at AED 622 million) have "put The World back on the map".

10 December 2013: Nakheel announced plans to connect the islands with a road.
January 2014: Kleindienst Group's JK Properties announces that "work has commenced on The Heart of Europe".
January 2014: Website "The Heart of Europe" publishes monthly construction updates for the project.
February 2014: JK Properties announces that the "Heart of Europe" islands construction is "well underway".
7 December 2016: The Heart of Europe project makes major progress when the Dubai-based company JK Bauen, part of the Kleindienst Group, appointed Chinese-based companies Wuchang Ship Building Industry Group and Sino Great Wall International Engineering in a joint venture to develop facilities on the six islands.

See also

List of developments of The World (archipelago)
OQYANA
Palm Islands
The Universe
Dubai Waterfront
Tourism in Dubai

References

External links

Nakheel.com: The World
"The Heart of Europe" website

Artificial islands of Dubai
Archipelagoes of the United Arab Emirates
Nakheel Properties
Proposed buildings and structures in Dubai
World maps
Maps in art